This was the tenth time India participating in the Commonwealth Games India ranked 5th in the final medal tally.

Medalists

Gold medalists

Silver medalists

Bronze medalists

References

Nations at the 1990 Commonwealth Games
India at the Commonwealth Games
1990 in Indian sport